Świątki (formerly ) is a part of the town Szczecinek, in West Pomeranian Voivodeship, in north-western Poland.

References

Szczecinek County